Borima Bay is the 6.5 km wide cove indenting for 8 km Oscar II Coast in Graham Land, Antarctica south of Diralo Point and north of Caution Point.  It is part of Exasperation Inlet, Weddell Sea formed as a result of the disintegration of Larsen Ice Shelf in the area in 2002 and the subsequent retreat of Jorum Glacier and Minzuhar Glacier.

The feature is named after the settlement of Borima in northern Bulgaria.

Location

Maps
 Antarctic Digital Database (ADD). Scale 1:250000 topographic map of Antarctica. Scientific Committee on Antarctic Research (SCAR), 1993–2016.

References
 Borima Bay. SCAR Composite Antarctic Gazetteer.
 Bulgarian Antarctic Gazetteer. Antarctic Place-names Commission. (details in Bulgarian, basic data in English)

External links
 Borima Bay. Copernix satellite image

Bays of Graham Land
Oscar II Coast
Bulgaria and the Antarctic